The Blind Astronomer's Daughter (New York, Bloomsbury, 2016) is a historical novel by John Pipkin

The novel tells the story of the life of Caroline Ainsworth from roughly 1750 to 1840. Born to a poor peasant family, who named her Siobhan and then abandoned her, she was taken in by the family of Owen O'Siodha, a blacksmith on an estate in Ireland named New Park. Owen and his wife, Moira, already have sons and have also adopted another foundling, Finn, when Siobhan is brought to them as an infant. Finn causes an accident in the blacksmith's workshop that leaves the baby Siobhan with a crippled arm and hand. Meanwhile, over in England Arthur Ainsworth inherits his family's estates, which includes New Park. Arthur is keenly interested in astronomy, and gradually becomes obsessed with competing with William Herschel for discoveries in the night sky. In particular, Arthur thinks there is a planet closer to the Sun than Mercury, and he eventually goes blind looking for it against the Sun's disk. Before Arthur moves from England to New Park, he meets Theodosia, a delightful young woman, in a bookstore and she becomes his wife. Settling in at New Park, she gives birth to twin girls who die right away. Hoping to help both families, Owen and Moira offer baby Siobhan to Arthur and Theodosia for adoption. The arrangement is concluded, but Theodosia also dies soon after, leaving Arthur as the single father of an adopted daughter. He renames her Caroline. Caroline and Arthur, as well as Owen's family, struggle for years to keep the estate running smoothly and build an observatory on top of the manor house. Caroline and Finn fall in love as adults, but the terrible political unrest in Ireland in the late 18th century prevents them from getting together and achieving happiness. In the end, they are separated and Caroline never learns what happens to Finn.

References

2016 American novels
American historical novels
Bloomsbury Publishing books